The 1982–83 OJHL season was the 11th season of the Ontario Junior Hockey League (OJHL). The nine teams of the league played a 48-game season. The top four teams of each division made the playoffs.

The winner of the OJHL playoffs, the North York Rangers, won the OHA Buckland Cup and then the Dudley Hewitt Cup as Central Canadian champions. The Rangers then defeated the Callaghan Cup champions from the Maritime Provinces to move on to the 1983 Centennial Cup. The Rangers won the Centennial Cup as national champions

Changes
Cambridge Winterhawks join the OJHL.
Guelph Platers leave OJHL for OHL.
North Bay Trappers leave the OJHL.
Brampton Warriors leave the OJHL.

Final standings
Note: GP = Games played; W = Wins; L = Losses; OTL = Overtime losses; SL = Shootout losses; GF = Goals for; GA = Goals against; PTS = Points; x = clinched playoff berth; y = clinched division title; z = clinched conference title

1982-83 OJHL Playoffs

Quarter-final
North York Rangers defeated Cambridge Winterhawks 4-games-to-none
Hamilton Mountain A's defeated Dixie Beehives 4-games-to-1
Orillia Travelways defeated Markham Waxers 4-games-to-3
Newmarket Flyers defeated Richmond Hill Rams 4-games-to-3
Semi-final
North York Rangers defeated Hamilton Mountain A's 4-games-to-3
Orillia Travelways defeated Newmarket Flyers 4-games-to-3
Final
North York Rangers defeated Orillia Travelways 4-games-to-none

OHA Buckland Cup Championship
The 1983 Buckland Cup was a best-of-5 series between the Elliot Lake Vikings (NOJHL) and the North York Rangers. The winner moved on to the 1983 Dudley Hewitt Cup.

North York Rangers defeated Elliot Lake Vikings (NOJHL) 3-games-to-2
North York 8 - Elliot Lake 4
Elliot Lake 5 - North York 4
North York 10 - Elliot Lake 4
Elliot Lake 6 - North York 5
North York 9 - Elliot Lake 3

Dudley Hewitt Cup Championship
The 1984 Dudley Hewitt Cup was a best-of-7 series between the Thunder Bay Kings (TBHL) and the North York Rangers. The winner moved on to the 1983 Eastern Centennial Cup championship.

North York Rangers defeated Thunder Bay Kings (TBHL) 4-games-to-none
North York 7 - Thunder Bay 1
North York 8 - Thunder Bay 4
North York 6 - Thunder Bay 4
North York 7 - Thunder Bay 4

1983 Eastern Canada Championship
The 1983 Eastern Canada Centennial Cup championship was a best-of-7 series between the Halifax Lions (MVJHL) and the North York Rangers. The winner moved on to the 1983 Centennial Cup championship.

North York Rangers defeated Halifax Lions (MVJHL) 4-games-to-1
North York 10 - Halifax 3
North York 7 - Halifax 6
Halifax 8 - North York 1
North York 7 - Halifax 5 OT
North York 9 - Halifax 3

1983 Centennial Cup Championship
The 1983 Centennial Cup was the best-of-7 Canadian National Junior A championship series between the Eastern Champion North York Rangers and the Western Abbott Cup champion Abbotsford Flyers (BCJHL).

North York Rangers defeated Abbotsford Flyers (BCJHL) 4-games-to-none
North York 9 - Abbotsford 6
North York 8 - Abbotsford 5
North York 10 - Abbotsford 3
North York 10 - Abbotsford 2

Leading Scorers

Players taken in the 1983 NHL Entry Draft
Rd 7 #129	Iain Duncan - 	Winnipeg Jets	(North York Rangers)

See also
 1983 Centennial Cup
 Dudley Hewitt Cup
 List of Ontario Hockey Association Junior A seasons
 Thunder Bay Junior A Hockey League
 Northern Ontario Junior Hockey League
 Central Junior A Hockey League
 1982 in ice hockey
 1983 in ice hockey

References

External links
 Official website of the Ontario Junior Hockey League
 Official website of the Canadian Junior Hockey League

Ontario Junior Hockey League seasons
OPJHL